Paneri is a village in Kamrup, situated in south bank of Brahmaputra river.

Transport
Paneri is accessible through National Highway 37. All major private commercial vehicles ply between Paneri and nearby towns.

See also
 Panikhaiti
 Palahartari

References

Villages in Kamrup district